Legislation on shared parenting is an attempt at family court reform to make shared parenting more common at the expense of sole custody, so that children of divorced parents can maintain a close daily relationship with both their mother and father. Based on scientific studies showing that children do better with shared versus sole custody, there are many organizations that advocate for shared parenting legislation, such as Americans for Parental Equality, the National Parents Organization, Americans for Equal Shared Parenting the Children's Rights Council, Families Need Fathers, the International Council on Shared Parenting, WISCONSIN for Children and Families(WFCF),  and Leading Women for Shared Parenting.

The following is a list of shared parenting legislation proposals by state and year along with information from each bill relevant to shared parenting and its current status.

Concepts within Shared Parenting Legislation
Family courts commonly order sole custody to one parent with visitation rights to the other. The various shared parenting legislation has some variance on a few concepts which will be pointed out here.

 Legal presumption vs consideration: A rebuttable legal presumption and preference (such as for joint custody over sole custody) give the courts a starting point. If the court determines that the legal presumption is not fit for the case, it must usually state what evidence it considers to have overcome the burden of proof associated with the legal presumption. These presumptions generally make exceptions for children suffering from abuse or neglect. A legal consideration requires the court to consider a specific type of custody, but adds no preference or presumption for it.
 Joint physical custody vs 50/50 parenting time: Different jurisdictions have differing definitions for joint physical custody. Many don't specify how much time must go to each parent to be considered joint (as opposed to sole) physical custody. Some of the legislation here aims to add a presumption for joint custody, while some of it aims to more clearly establish that parenting time should be approximately equal. Some of the legislation also aims to limit the amount of inequality in parenting time, such as setting it to at worst 35/65.
 Child support: Most child support guidelines were developed for sole rather than shared custody. This type of legislation specifies how child support should be calculated when there is equal or close to equal parenting time.

Summary table

Alabama 
Alabama Senate Bill 186 (2017) sought to create a legal presumption that joint custody is in the best interest of the child. While it did not specify what sort of time-sharing dynamics were to be considered for joint custody, it did specifically remove the language stating: "joint custody does not necessarily mean equal physical custody," This bill died in the senate chamber and did not receive a floor vote.

Alaska 
Alaska House Bill 368 (2018) attempted to establish that rebuttable presumption of shared physical custody was in the best interest of the child, and define it as the child residing with each parent for 50 percent of the year. The burden required to overcome the presumption was a preponderance of the evidence. This bill died in committee and did not receive a floor vote.

Arizona 
In 2012 Arizona Senate Bill 1127 was introduced. It changed a lot of language around child custody law that, among other things: removed the need for the court to consider the wish of the parents or children under suitable age and maturity, required the court consider if one parent intentionally mislead the court or delayed the process, encouraged the court to produce parenting plans that maximized time with each parent, and instructed the court not to consider the gender of the parents or children. Unlike other bills mentioned here, this bill created a rebuttable presumption against joint custody if domestic violence has occurred. This bill passed the Arizona Senate by unanimous vote and the Arizona House by a vote of 46 - 9. It was signed into law on 9 May 2012 by Governor Jan Brewer.

In 2017 Arizona House Bill 2296 was introduced. This bill would have entered a rebuttable presumption that joint legal decision-making and equal parenting time are in the best interests of the child. This bill died in chamber before receiving a floor vote.

Connecticut 
Connecticut drafted two bills in 2017 seeking to develop shared parenting. House Bill 6638 (2017) would have made a number of changes including: establishing language around parental alienation, altering some aspects of how a guardian ad litem works, establishing a presumption of joint custody with a clear and convincing burden of proof, and require that a court enter written findings when not awarding joint custody. House Bill 6645 sought to establish that shared parenting with equal access to the child is in the child's best interest, unless the court provides overwhelming evidence to the contrary. Both of these bills died in committee and did not receive a floor vote.

Florida 
Florida Senate Bill 668 (2016) addressed both shared parenting and alimony. It would have required that a court, upon making a parenting plan, begin with the premise that a minor child should spend approximately equal time with each parent. It also removed language stating that there was no presumption for any specific parenting plan. It also sought to set limits both on the amount and duration of alimony, setting a maximum duration of one-half the length of the marriage. This bill passed the Florida House with a vote of 74-38 and the Florida Senate with a vote of 24-14. While it was awaiting signing or veto by Governor Rick Scott, his office received more than 11,000 calls in regards to it; 80 percent of which were in support. Scott also heard directly from several organizations including the National Organization for Women, the Florida League of Women Voters, and several representatives from the Florida Bar who opposed the bill. Scott ultimately decided to veto the bill on April 15, 2016.

Georgia 
In the 2019-2020 legislative session, Representative Jasmine Clark (D-108) introduced House Bill 1140, which would create a rebuttable presumption that a child's best interests are served by equal or approximately equal parenting time with each parent.  The bi-partisan bill was introduced and referred to the judiciary committee on March 9, 2020.  The legislature was suspended on March 13, 2020 due to the COVID-19 pandemic and the bill was tabled when the legislature reconvened.

Illinois 
In the 2017 - 2018 session, Illinois drafted House Bill 4113. This bill would have presumed both that the child should have equal time with both parents and that both parents are fit, unless the court is presented with clear and convincing evidence otherwise. This bill has not been voted on and has not been placed on a calendar for a vote.

Iowa 
Iowa introduced Senate Bill 2374 in the 2017-2018 session. This bill sought to create a rebuttable presumption that if joint legal custody is awarded, joint physical custody should also be awarded. It also required that courts site clear and convincing evidence when not awarding joint physical custody. Finally, it removed language indicating that the court should consider if one parent is opposed to joint custody. This bill died in committee before a floor vote.

Oklahoma 
In 2019 House Bill 1276 was introduced in Oklahoma. This bill addresses temporary custody orders requiring that the court provide equally shared parenting time at the request of one parent unless it finds it is in the best interest of the child not to. This bill is still under review.

Kansas 
Kansas drafted both Senate Bill 257 and House Bill 2529 for the 2017-2018 session. These were identical co-bills. They would have introduced two rebuttable presumptions: that any parenting plan agreed on by both parents is in the best interest of the child, and that in the event the parents don't agree, the best interest of the child is to have equal or approximately time with each parent. Both of these presumptions required clear and convincing evidence overcome. These bills both died in committee.

For the 2019-2020 session, Kansas introduced Senate Bill 157. This bill addresses only temporary custody orders. It establishes a presumption that the court award equal parenting time in temporary orders. An amendment has been added removing the presumption if information is provided that would support a finding by the court that domestic abuse has occurred. This bill is under review.

Kentucky 
In 2017 Kentucky drafted House Bill 492 , which addressed temporary custody orders. This bill established that if both parents agreed on a temporary order, the court would presume that is the best arrangement for the child and that if they did not agree, the court would presume the parents should share the temporary custody equally. The burden required to rebut this presumption is a preponderance of the evidence, and the court must enter facts and findings when rebutting it. This bill passed the Kentucky Senate and Kentucky House with no dissenting votes and was signed into law on 10 April 2017 by Governor Matt Bevin.

In 2018 Kentucky introduced House Bill 528. This bill is similar to House Bill 492 but addresses permanent custody orders. It created a presumption rebuttable by a preponderance of the evidence that both joint custody and equally shared parenting time is in the best interest of the child and requires the court to enter facts and findings when deviating from shared parenting. Unlike House Bill 492, this bill added, among the factors for consideration, a factored regarding if the court makes a finding that one of the parties committed domestic violence. House Bill 528 passed the Kentucky Senate by unanimous vote and the Kentucky House by an 81-2 vote. It was signed into law on 26 April 2018 by Governor Matt Bevin.

Minnesota 
In 2011 Minnesota introduce House Bill 322. Before it was introduced, Minnesota had a presumption that parents should be granted at least 25% of the parenting time. This bill initially sought to increase that number to 45%, but was amended to increase parenting time only up to 35%. This bill passed the Minnesota House by an 86 - 42 vote, and passed the Minnesota Senate by a 46 - 19 vote. After hearing from proponents such as the Center for Parental Responsibility, and opponents including the Family Law Section of the Minnesota Bar and battered women's advocates, Governor Mark Dayton decided not to sing the bill, thus causing a pocket veto.

House Bill 2699 was introduced in Minnesota in 2017. This bill aimed to increase the presumed minimum parenting time to 40%, unless both parents agreed otherwise. This bill did in chamber.

Minnesota drafted House Bill 46 in 2019. This bill would require that, upon the request of either parent, there be a rebuttable presumption of joint legal and joint physical custody unless domestic abuse has occurred between the parties. It would also establish that joint custody means that each parent receives 50 percent of the parenting time. This bill also states that the court may determine how to calculate what 50 percent parenting time means, and suggests the method of counting overnights. This bill is still under review.

Missouri 
In 2016 Missouri introduced House Bill 1550. This bill required that the court enter written findings in any case where the parents have not agreed on a custody arrangement. It also established that a court may not presume one parent is more qualified based on their sex. It established a method with which a parent who is denied their parenting time can bring it to the court. It ensured that the system of family courts shall not adopt any local rule for standardizing or creating a default parenting plan. Finally, it required that the court create a handbook detailing guidelines on how to create a parenting plan to be distributed to each parent. This bill passed the Missouri House unanimously and the Missouri Senate by a vote of 149 - 2. It was signed into law by Governor Jay Nixon.

In 2018 Missouri introduced House Bill 1667, which would have established a presumption, rebuttable by a preponderance of the evidence, that equal or approximately equal parenting time is in the best interest of the child. This bill passed the Missouri House by a vote of 137 - 7, however it did not receive a vote in the Missouri Senate due to Senator Schupp threatening to filibuster.

In 2019 Missouri introduced House Bill 229 and Senate Bill 14, which were originally identical to each other and very similar to the previous year's House Bill 1667. They seek to established a presumption, rebuttable by a preponderance of the evidence, that equal or approximately equal parenting time is in the best interest of the child. House Bill 229 has since had an amendment to clarify that the court may accept an arrangement both parents agree on without overcoming the presumption as well as an amendment that the presumption is overcome if the court finds that a pattern of domestic violence has occurred. House Bill 229 thus became the primary bill and died without a vote from the Missouri Senate floor.

New Hampshire 
House Bill 236 was introduced in New Hampshire in 2017. It intended to change child support in cases where the parents have comparable parenting time. It would have established that child support goes from the higher-earning parent to the lower-earning parent. It would have also established how child support should be calculated. This bill failed a floor vote in the New Hampshire House by a vote of 171 - 178.

House Bill 362 was introduced in New Hampshire in 2019. This bill is very similar to the 2017 bill. One notable difference is that it changes the language from "comparable time" to "equal or approximately equal time." This bill is under review.

New Jersey 
For the 2018 - 2019 session New Jersey drafted two similar bills: Assembly Bill 1091 and Senate Bill 273. These bills seek to establish a presumption of joint legal and physical custody. they also would establish a rebuttable presumption of equal or approximately equal physical custody. Rebutting this presumption requires clear and convincing evidence that joint custody is harmful to the child. These bills are under review.

South Carolina 
South Carolina introduced House Bill 3569 in 2022. This bill seeks to establish a presumption, rebuttable by clear and convincing evidence, that equally shared parenting time is in the best interest of the child with parents willing, able, and fit. This bill is under review in judiciary committee.

South Dakota 
In 2019 South Dakota drafted House Bill 1104. This bill makes the presumption that joint physical custody be awarded in cases where joint legal custody is awarded, it defines joint physical custody as "equal time-sharing," and sets the burden required to overcome the presumption as a preponderance of the evidence. It would also remove language from the law stating that there would not be a presumption of joint physical custody. This bill is under review.

Texas 
House Bill 453 was considered in Texas for the 2017 - 2018 legislative session. This bill sought to set the policy of the state to encourage separated and divorced parents to share custody equally. It also encouraged the court, when making a parenting plan, to ensure the difference in number of days provided to each parent per year not exceed five. This bill died in committee.

House Bill 803 would provide a presumption of 50/50 parenting time for fit, willing, and able parents. It was considered during the 2021 Texas legislative session. The bill had over 20 bipartisan co-authors and nearly 200 parents and activists provided testimony to the JJFI committee. Despite this, the bill was effectively killed by Chairwoman Neave.

Virginia 
In 2018 Virginia drafted House Bill 1351. This bill indicated that the court should consider awarding joint custody but established that there should be no presumption for any form of custody. This bill passed by unanimous vote in the Virginia House and the Virginia Senate and became law on 18 May 2018.

Wisconsin 
In 2000 Wisconsin added two significant legislative changes via the budget bill (ACT 9). A presumption that joint custody is in a child's best interest.  And instructions to maximize the amount of time allotted to both parents.  The courts in WI prior to this were instructed to not consider gender in custody or placement decisions.  From actual placement studies done in WI by UW IRP, shared placement doubled in the 90's (from approx 15% to 30% in divorce cases).  In the first decade of the 2000's thanks partially to the ACT 9 legislative changes, shared placement in divorce cases had increased to 50% (2010).  Unmarried parents fared much worse in regards to shared parenting outcomes compared to divorcing parents (only 15% shared in 2008).  An initial Presumption of Equal Placement bill has been introduced several times in the second decade of the 2000's, but has failed to get significant traction. A recent (2019) study again by UW-IRP shows that Wisconsin and Maine have shared parenting outcomes for almost half of divorces, compared to an average of 25% shared placement outcomes in other states.

Wyoming 
Wyoming introduced [https://legiscan.com/WY/bill/HB0114/2019 House Bill 114 in 2019. This bill was not passed. There are a few groups working to change the laws to a rebuttable presumption of shared parenting. Kids Deserve Dads and its founder, Zac Martin are leading the charge to bring shared parenting to the children of Wyoming. There will be another bill in the near future either 2022 or 2023 session.

References 

Child custody
Children's rights
Divorce
Family law
Parenting-related lists